Alberto Janes (1909–1971) was a Portuguese songwriter. He was one of the most popular Portuguese songwriters of the 1950s and 1960s, responsible for many of the hits of Amália Rodrigues.

References

Portuguese songwriters
Male songwriters
1909 births
1971 deaths
20th-century Portuguese writers